The Electromancer is the second solo album released by Daisuke Asakura on July 21, 1995, and the first solo album released by Asakura after his departure from the popular J-pop group Access. It features vocals by Takanori Nishikawa and Shingo Katsurayama.

Track listing

 All songs produced, composed and arranged by Daisuke Asakura

References
 Official Daisuke Asakura Discography

Daisuke Asakura albums
1995 albums